Axel Kamp (1 April 1921 – 13 June 2019) was a Swedish curler.

He was a 1975 Swedish men's champion and a 1985 Swedish mixed champion.

In 1968 he was inducted into the Swedish Curling Hall of Fame.

Teams

Men's

Mixed

Personal life
His son Ragnar Kamp is a curler too, .

References

External links
 

1921 births
2019 deaths
People from Härnösand
Swedish male curlers
Swedish curling champions
Sportspeople from Västernorrland County
20th-century Swedish people